Jakhya (Garhwali: जख्या; Urdu: زخیا) (also called dog mustard or wild mustard) is the seed of the Cleome viscosa plant used for tempering on culinary dishes. It is mostly grown and consumed in Uttarakhand and in the Terai regions of India and Nepal.

The seeds are dark brown in color, and crackles on being heated in oil. It is used in the Garhwali and Kumaoni styles of cuisines.

References

Essential oils
Medicinal plants of Asia
Indian spices
Non-timber forest products
Spices
Edible nuts and seeds
Crops
Cleome